is a 1993 action role-playing beat 'em up arcade game developed and published by Konami. Taking place in a fantasy world, the game follows prince Gerard Himerce, joined by the half-human fairy Elaine Shee and the exiled dragon duke Galahad, seeking vengeance for destruction of his homeland against the Zar Harc empire led by the King of Darkness and prevent him from resurrecting an ancient demon. Through the journey, players explore and search for items to progress and power-ups, fighting enemies and bosses, and gaining experience points to increase their character's maximum health and level.

Gaiapolis was directed by Hiroyuki Ashida, who previously worked on Gradius II and Detana!! TwinBee. Japanese animator Shūjirō Hamakawa, who also worked on Detana!! TwinBee, acted as game and character designer. Konami Kukeiha Club members Satoko Miyawaki, Seiichi Fukami and Yuji Takenouchi produced the music and sound respectively. The game was supplemented by an album from King Records, and a manga adaptation written and illustrated by Hamakawa. It never received an official home conversion, although an unlicensed port for Famicom was developed and published by Sachen in 1994.

Gaiapolis proved popular among Japanese arcade players, earning several awards from Gamest magazine, but garnered middling response from gaming publications that regarded it as a strange game due to the mixture of action and adventure genres, feeling that its playstyle was more reserved for consoles and not suitable for arcades, with criticism being geared towards its direction and story as well as the monotonous fighting actions, but commended its multiplayer and found the addition of a password system innovative within the arcade scene. The character of Elaine Shee would later make appearances in other Konami titles. Retrospective commentary has been more positive, with some expressing disappointment and questioning for the lack of a console release.

Gameplay 

Gaiapolis is an overhead fantasy action role-playing beat 'em up game that can be played by up to two players simultaneously. The plot follows Gerard Himerce, Prince of the Kingdom of Avalon, as he seeks vengeance against the Empire of Zar Harc for the destruction of his homeland. Joined by the half-human fairy Elaine, last survivor of the Shee clan, and Galahad, an exiled duke from the land of the dragons, Gerard goes on a journey to prevent his older half-brother Albert, now the leader of Zar Harc, the King of Darkness, from reviving an ancient demon. Along the way, they are guided by a mysterious spirit known as the Warrior of Fire, who tells them to seek three keys that have been scattered around the world in order to enter the floating citadel of Gaiapolis.

The objective is to fight against every enemy and eventually defeat the boss at the end of each stage before time runs out. The player can choose to play as the prince Gerard, the fairy Elaine or the dragon Galahad, with each character possessing advantages and disadvantages. Both Gerard and Galahad are swordsmen, while Elaine is a martial artist who wields twin tonfas. Along the way, players can pick up items such as food to replenish health, weapon and equipment upgrades, eggs that carry guardian beasts inside, jewels with magic powers and treasures that give out more points. An experience point system is employed, in which the player's maximum level and health are increased by defeating enemies. There are a total of 17 stages in the game, although some can be skipped depending on the course of action taken by the player.

The controls consist of an eight-way joystick for moving the character and three action buttons. The first action button serves as the primary attack button and performs consecutive attacks against enemies. Players can also hold the attack to guard against enemy attacks if the player character is in possession of a shield unless the player is controlling the Elaine, who uses her own tonfas to block enemy attacks. Rotating the joystick clockwise, or counterclockwise if the player is controlling Elaine, will cause the character to perform a spinning attack. Double-tapping the joystick at any direction enables the character to perform a running attack.

When accompanied by a guardian beast, players can press the second action button to send their companion to attack nearby enemies or pick up items. However, the beast has its life gauge and will perish if it takes too much damage. Players can press the button to call the beast back to the character's side and allow it to regenerate its own health. There are three guardians available: Goblin (a small armored warrior in a blue egg), Rollin (an armadillo-like creature in a brown egg) and Garuda (a flying baby dragon in a purple egg). Each beast has its own attack pattern. When a character picks an egg of the same color while his or her companion is still around, the companion's maximum health will increase. If the player picks a different colored egg, the companion will be replaced with one inside the egg.

A magic spell can be performed with the third action button if the player is in possession of a jewel. The more jewels in the player's possession, the more powerful the magic spell will become. However, the magic spell consumes all the jewels in the player's possession, leaving none to perform another spell until the player collects more. There are seven magic spells in the game, with the most powerful one requiring ten jewels. The game is over if a player's character sustains too much damage or a boss is not defeated in time, unless more credits are inserted into the arcade machine to continue playing. In addition to this feature, players can also use passwords to continue the game where they left off at a later point. The game over screen will give a nine letter password (six kana characters in the Japanese version), which the player can enter the next time the game is started. If entered correctly, the player will be taken to the last stage they played with the character they were using with their weapon, equipment and experience level intact.

Development 

Gaiapolis was directed by Hiroyuki "A.C.D." Ashida, who previously worked on Gradius II and Detana!! TwinBee. Both the plot and story were written by Tadasu "Tadasuke" Kitae, who also served as co-programmer alongside Hideo "Hides" Shiozaki and Tomohiro "Tom" Ishimoto. Yasuhiro "Idaten" Noguchi led the game's art direction.

Japanese animator Shūjirō Hamakawa (credited under the pseudonym Shuzilow.Ha), who worked on Crime Fighters and Detana!! TwinBee, acted as game and character designer. Hamakawa recounted the development of Gaiapolis in a series of posts via Twitter, stating that he was responsible for eighty percent of the game's graphic design. He revealed that the King of Darkness was inspired by The Kurgan from Highlander. Hamakawa also revealed that a second loop was planned, initiated by defeating the King of Darkness and getting to the throne. The second journey would have involved the fairy and the dragon facing against the prince, whose strength depended on the level reached by the player. However, Hamakawa stated that it was scrapped due to its prolonged playtime. Hamakawa revealed as well that light and dark weapons were planned, but scrapped due to their complicated system and difficulty of being explained in a arcade game. Manga artist Akihiro Yamada was responsible for the promotional flyer art illustration, which was requested by Hamakawa.

Konami Kukeiha Club members Satoko "Fairy" Miyawaki, Seiichi "Prophet" Fukami and Yuji Takenouchi (under the alias "Technouchi") produced the music and sound respectively. Satoko Miyawaki stated that  Gaiapolis was created in conjunction with Lethal Enforcers, and Mystic Warriors, with all of their desks and instruments lined up to each other. Seiichi Fukami stated that he was in charge of the game's soundtrack, and he remarked that the musical score was infused with orchestral, ethnic and cinematic music. Fukami claimed that development proved to be long and it was difficult managing the amount of compositions he was working on, losing track of details when approaching the range of 40 songs in total. When having a writer's block, Miyawaki would look at the drawings and songs of her co-workers, while she also commented that Kenichiro Fukui would request their help with tracks for Lethal Enforcers, when Takenouichi was occasionally humming a tune when thinking over new ideas during lunchtime.

Release 
Gaiapolis was released in Japanese arcades in April 1993 by Konami. The game was showcased during the 1993 AOU Show, and also in North America during the 1993 ACME show in Las Vegas. The release was supplemented by an album containing the game's original soundtrack and other Konami titles was distributed in Japan by King Records on August 21, featuring two arranged tracks by Seiichi Fukami that were later included as part of a compilation album published in 1998, as well as a one-shot manga adaptation in the August 1993 issue of Shinseisha's Comic Gamest manga anthology written and illustrated by Shūjirō Hamakawa. It remains exclusive to arcades and has not received an official home conversion, though an unlicensed port for Famicom was developed and published by the Taiwanese company Sachen in 1994.

Reception 

In Japan, Game Machine listed Gaiapolis on their June 1, 1993 issue as being the tenth most-popular arcade game during the month. At the 1993 Gamest Awards, it was nominated for Game of the Year (ranked 9th) and garnered several awards, including Best Action (ranked 4th), Best Graphics (ranked 8th), Best VGM (ranked 7th) and Best Production (ranked 3rd).

Gaiapolis received middling response from gaming publications. French magazine Joypad noted its mixture of action and adventure genres, stating that the playstyle is more reserved for consoles, and found the addition of a password system innovative within the arcade scene. Ação Games regarded it as a strange game from Konami, but commended its multiplayer and password feature. Gamests five reviewers gave a positive remark to the audiovisual presentation but criticized its story and direction for being uninteresting, while noting that battling enemies by performing the same fighting actions was monotonous. They felt that the game challenged the notion that the action role-playing genre was not suitable for arcades, recommending it for players that enjoyed titles like Cadash and Dark Seal.

Retrospective coverage 
Retrospective commentary for Gaiapolis has been more positive. Sega-16s Ken Horowitz highly commended its Dungeons And Dragons-esque hack and slash gameplay, character designs and colorful visuals but expressed disappointment towards the lack of a home release, specifically for the 32X. Spanish website MeriStation labeled it as a novel action role-playing game. Retro Gamer gave positive remarks to its high-quality production, stating that the visuals were amongst the best of their era. They also concurred with Horowitz by questioning the lack of a home conversion, saying that "it would have made a good early release on the PlayStation or Saturn." Eidy Tasaka of Revista PlayReplay ranked it on his special feature of forgotten beat 'em ups at the number five spot. Tasaka found its vertical-oriented display surprising, commenting that it was both a risky and "successful" move from Konami to make the game more interesting. Hardcore Gaming 101s Robert E. Naytor regarded it as "the most original of Konami's arcade brawlers." However, Naytor unfavorably compared it with the Dungeons And Dragons games by Capcom.

Legacy 
The character of Elaine Shee would later make appearances outside of Gaiapolis in other Konami titles; Elaine appears as an unlockable playable character in the 3D competitive fighting game Battle Tryst (1998). She also makes a brief cameo in the interactive game TwinBee Paradise in Donburishima.

Notes

References

External links 

 Gaiapolis at GameFAQs
 Gaiapolis at Killer List of Videogames
 Gaiapolis at MobyGames

1993 video games
Action role-playing video games
Arcade video games
Cooperative video games
Fantasy video games
Japan-exclusive video games
Konami arcade games
Konami beat 'em ups
Konami games
Nintendo Entertainment System games
Top-down video games
Unauthorized video games
Video games featuring female protagonists
Video games scored by Yuji Takenouchi
Video games developed in Japan